Ramanaa is a 2002 Indian Tamil-language vigilante action film written and directed by A. R. Murugadoss, stars Vijayakanth, Simran and Ashima Bhalla  in lead roles. The film is about a man named Ramana who decides to abolish corruption completely with the help of his ex-students who are working in various government offices. The film released on 4 November 2002. It received positive reviews from critics and became a superhit. It was awarded the 2002 Tamil Nadu State Film Award for Best Film and A. R. Murugadoss won the Tamil Nadu State Film Award for Best Dialogue Writer. The film was dubbed and released in Hindi as Mar Mitenge 3 in 2015.

Plot 
Ramanaa begins with the abduction of 15 Tahsildars. After three days in captivity, 14 officers are released, but one is murdered. The police find a tape recording and a file on the dead officer's body that provide significant evidence concerning the kidnapping and subsequent murder. The file suggests that the crimes were committed by members of the self-proclaimed "Anti-Corruption Force" (ACF), a citizen militia seeking to eliminate corruption through vigilante acts. The militia, acting as a kangaroo court, "sentenced" corrupt officials in the area to death, beginning with the captured revenue officers who were apparently engaging in criminal activity.

The film's setting then shifts to M. Ramanaa, a mild-mannered professor at National College, who lives in a house with four adopted kids. While treating his adopted child at a big private hospital, Ramanaa discovers that the officials at the facility are engaging in extortion and fraud. After collecting evidence of the hospital staff's deception, Ramanaa turns them over to the authorities. The ringleader is the hospital dean, Rishi, who commits suicide when this is discovered. His grief-stricken father, a big and powerful construction magnate named Bhadrinarayanan, vows to take revenge on the man responsible for his son's death. Meanwhile, the ACF goes on kidnapping the top 15 corrupt officials each month and then killing the #1. Those officials include officials from transport, PWD, revenue, sports, health, etc. Then, suddenly, Devaki, a college girl and friend of Ramana's kids, finds out about him being the leader of the ACF. She questions him about this immoral activity.

Seven years ago, Ramana was a college professor with a small cute family, of him, his nine-month pregnant wife Chithra, and his daughter. During the festival of Deepavali, Ramanaa's apartment building collapses due to heavy construction work near-by, killing many residents including Chitra and his daughter. Recovering from the incident, he demands to know who was responsible for the building's collapse. He discovers that the building was built and owned by Bhadrinarayanan, who knowingly constructed the complex on loose soil. When Ramanaa confronts the District Council with evidence, Bhadrinarayanan walks in and boasts about all the bribe he has thrown to the top district officials including the collector. he gives Ramanaa a chance to call any two top officials in the state and get him arrested, but both the officials who are called immediately hang up. Frustrated, Ramanaa seals the room and attacks all officers, and as he is about to kill Bhadrinarayanan, he is beaten badly by his men, and is thrown on a highway. He is then rescued by National college students, who were on a trip. In response to Bhadrinarayanan's actions, and the general corruption in the region, Ramanaa forms the Anti-Corruption Force (ACF).

Meanwhile, a local police constable, frustrated for being not promoted, as he could not bribe officials, begins secretly building the case against the ACF. The constable eventually realizes that the ACF is primarily composed of people who do not take bribes. He visits multiple revenue offices, but his superiors neglect him due to him being their low associate. Then, a message comes saying that civil supply officers are going to be taken. All corrupt officials try to get police protection by proving their corruption, but at the last moment, the ACF switches to Police department. All corrupt civil supply officers are arrested, and the government promises to employ 25,000 youngsters within a week. 15 district police chiefs are kidnapped. The police officer is killed, and everyone is frustrated. An IPS Punjabi officer is flown from Delhi to head the case.

Meanwhile, Bhadrinarayanan is trying to re-corrupt the officials. As the final stroke, the top 15 dons are kidnapped. Ramanaa personally comes to Bhadrinarayanan. As was done to him, he gives the same lifeline to Bhadri, to call any two people within India. This time, Bhadrinarayanan fails, and is kidnapped and later killed. Then, the constable reveals his plan to his superiors, and the IPS officer is delighted.

The officer takes swift action against them. The ACF members are captured and tortured by the police but refuse to reveal Ramanaa's identity. Ramanaa is overcome with guilt over his students' sacrifice and surrenders himself, on the condition that all the other members of the ACF be released. He is tried and convicted of being the mastermind organiser behind the murders of Bhadrinarayanan and 14 other government officials, and is sentenced to death. Public pressure from the sympathetic community and family makes the Chief Minister offer Ramanaa a pardon appeal, which will definitely give him complete freedom. However, Ramanaa refuses, stating that only he must face the consequences of his actions, and is hanged the next day. The constable is offered a promotion for his role in disbanding the ACF, but he refuses out of guilt.

Cast 

 Vijayakanth as M. Ramanaa
 Simran as Chithra
 Ashima Bhalla as Devaki
 Vijayan as Bhadrinarayanan
 Yugi Sethu as Narayanan
 Riyaz Khan as Rishi (Bhadrinarayanan's son)
 Ravichandran as Chief Minister of Tamil Nadu
 Rajesh as District Collector
 Mukesh Rishi as Jalandhar Singh
 Sudarshan
 Ravikumar
 Durai as ACF Member
 Kalairani
 Kalyani
 U. B. G. Menon
 Ilavarasu
 Pooja Sundharesh as Ramanaa's late daughter
 Mahanadhi Shankar as Rowdy
 Sampath Ram as Rowdy
 Pondy Ravi
 Crane Manohar
 P. S. Sridhar as Henchman (uncredited)

Production 
The film was initially titled as Valluvan. Yugi Sethu replaced R. Madhavan in the role of a constable in the film.

Remakes 
Ramanaa was remade in Telugu as Tagore and it was made several changes for different scenes, flashback episode and the climax, in its Kannada as Vishnu Sena, the climax was borrowed from Telugu version climax. In Bengali as Tiger and in Hindi as Gabbar is Back. The Bangladeshi film Warning was an unofficial remake of this movie.

Soundtrack 

The Ramanaa soundtrack was composed by Ilaiyaraaja, and is the only collaboration by Murugadoss and Ilaiyaraaja. The soundtrack has 8 songs.

Reception 
Malathi Rangarajan of The Hindu opined that "The concept is Utopian and the sequences almost implausible, but A. R. Murugadas sends a ray of hope for society's honest lot, through his 'Ramana'". A critic from Sify wrote that "Vijaykanth's Ramanaa is an engrossing crime drama which overflows with sharp dialogues against the corrupt system and is shot stylishly by director A.R. Murugadoss". Malini Mannath of Chennai Online said that "'Ramana' is a watch 'able' film despite its flaws".

Box office 
The film was a critical and commercial success. It served as a trendsetter in later years. The film had a strong cult following till date.

References

External links 
 

2002 films
Indian action films
Indian vigilante films
Films about corruption in India
Tamil films remade in other languages
Films scored by Ilaiyaraaja
Films directed by AR Murugadoss
2000s Tamil-language films
Fictional portrayals of the Tamil Nadu Police
2002 action films
2000s vigilante films